"That's How Much I Love You" is a country music song written by Arnold, Fowler, and Hall, sung by Eddy Arnold, and released in 1946 on the RCA Victor label (catalog no. 20-1948-A). In October 1946, it reached No. 2 on the Billboard folk chart. It was also ranked as the No. 10 record on the Billboard 1946 year-end folk juke box chart.

Cover versions
 Frank Sinatra covered "That's How Much I Love You" in 1947.  His version reached #10 (U.S.).
 Bing Crosby also covered the song and his version reached No. 17 in 1947 
 Pat Boone covered the song in 1958.  His rendition peaked at #39 on the U.S. Billboard Hot 100.

See also
 Billboard Most-Played Folk Records of 1946

References

1946 songs
1946 singles
1947 singles
1958 singles
Eddy Arnold songs
Frank Sinatra songs
Pat Boone songs
RCA Victor singles
Dot Records singles